Destino (Destiny) is the title of a studio album released by Cuban salsa singer Rey Ruiz. It contains the lead single "Mienteme Otra Vez" which became a #1 hit on the Tropical Airplay chart in the US.

Track listing

Charts

References

1996 albums
Rey Ruiz albums
Spanish-language albums
Sony Discos albums